Sutarfeni (સુતરફેણી) is a Gujarati sweet, made with shredded, all-purpose flour roasted in ghee (clarified butter), blended with melted sugar, and topped with finely chopped pistachios and almonds.
The product is typically flavored with powdered cardamom and/or rose petals. It may be white in color, scented with floral essences such as rose water or screwpine, or it may be colored and flavored with saffron.

History 
Strand-like pheni were Phenakas mentioned in various Indian texts. Phenakas is a broad term which includes various dishes prepared by using layered fried dough. Vijayanagar records indicate that Pheni was another much relished sweet dish prepared from wheat flour and sugar, similar to phenaka of North India and had varieties like sugar pheni, milk pheni and vermicelli pheni

References 

Indian desserts
Sugar confectionery